The Nasamones were a nomadic Berber tribe inhabiting southeast Libya. They were believed to be a Numidian people, along with the Garamantes.

They took their name from Nasamon (Νασάμων), the son of Amphithemis and the nymph Tritonis.

The Nasamones were centred in the oases of Augila and Siwa in the Libyan Desert. They used war chariots, like the Garamantes. They were known to attack the Greek colonies in Cyrenaica. During the Peloponnesian War, the citizens of Euesperides received aid from the Spartan general Gylippus, who helped defend the town from the Nasamones on his way to Sicily. Later, Pliny the Elder recounts that the Nasamones defeated the Psylli tribe in war, expelling them from the area. The Roman emperor Augustus attempted to pacify the desert tribes and sent proconsul Publius Sulpicius Quirinus to govern Creta et Cyrenaica in 15 BC. The Nasamones were temporarily subjugated by the Romans and remained relatively autonomous. According to Cassius Dio, they rose up a century later when the Romans tried to extort money from them. They began raiding the coastal settlements again until they were pushed back to the interior by Gnaeus Suellius Flaccus. 

Later during Late Antiquity and the Early Middle Ages, the Nasamones became vassals of the Eastern Roman Empire. Procopius writes that the Nasamones remained pagan until the sixth century when the emperor Justinian built a church for them in Awjila.

It is unknown what became of the Nasamones after that period; they likely remained a Christian semi-nomadic tribe until the Islamic conquests.

See also 
Awjila
Cyrenaica
Garamantes

References 

Berber peoples and tribes
Ancient Cyrenaica
Tribes in Greco-Roman historiography
Tuareg
Ancient Libyans